Tyson Beukeboom (born March 10, 1991) is a Canadian rugby union player. She made her debut as a member of ‘s national team at the 2013 Nations Cup, and represented Canada at three consecutive Women's Rugby World Cups, starting with the silver medal-winning squad at France 2014.

Early life
Beukeboom is the daughter of former NHL ice hockey player Jeff Beukeboom. She was born in Edmonton, Alberta, during her father's fifth season with the Edmonton Oilers. She attended St. Francis Xavier University.

Career
In 2012, Beukeboom was named the CIS Female Athlete of the Year. She was a member of 's squad at the Women's Rugby World Cups in France 2014, Ireland 2017, and New Zealand 2021 (delayed to 2022 by the COVID-19 pandemic).

References

External links
 Rugby Canada Player Profile

1991 births
Living people
Canadian female rugby union players
Canada women's international rugby union players
Canadian people of Dutch descent
Sportspeople from Edmonton